Several ships have been named Severn for the River Severn:

 was launched at Bristol and spent most of her career as a West Indiaman. In 1813 she ran down and sank another merchantman. In late 1838 Severns crew had to abandon her in the Atlantic in a sinking condition. 
Severn was launched in 1812 at Calcutta. She sailed to England where the navy purchased her in  1813 for use as a troopship and transport and renamed her . She had an uneventful naval career and the navy sold her in 1831. Her new owner returned her to her name of Severn. She made one voyage to Bengal and back for the British East India Company (EIC). She continued to trade with India but disappeared circa 1841 while sailing from Calcutta to China.
 was launched in Chepstow. Her crew abandoned her in the Baltic on 28 November 1825.

See also
 - one of nine ships of the Royal Navy
 - one of four ships of the United States Navy

Severn-class lifeboat

Ship names